Tisha Volleman (born 26 October 1999 in Eindhoven) is a Dutch artistic gymnast and a member of the national team.

Senior career
Volleman competed at the 2015 World Artistic Gymnastics Championships, where she helped her team place 8th, thus earning direct qualification for the 2016 Summer Olympics.

Volleman represented the Netherlands at the 2016 AT&T American Cup, held in Newark. She placed 8th.

Volleman was part of the Dutch team that took the bronze medal behind Russia and France at the 2018 European Championships.

At the 2022 Cottbus World Cup, Volleman won the gold medal on the uneven bars, and took the bronze on floor exercise.

At the 2022 European Championships in Munich, Volleman helped the Netherlands qualify to the team final, where they finished fourth behind Italy, Great Britain and Germany.

References

1999 births
Living people
Dutch female artistic gymnasts
Sportspeople from Eindhoven
Originators of elements in artistic gymnastics
20th-century Dutch women
21st-century Dutch women